Populus × tomentosa, commonly known as Chinese white poplar or Peking poplar, is a species of tree in the family Salicaceae. It is found across northern and eastern China, and has been introduced to the US state of Louisiana.

Populus × tomentosa is a large tree. The species has strong resistance to many diseases and insects. It also plays key roles in shelterbelts and urban afforestation in northern China.

Populus × tomentosa has long been suspected to be a hybrid, but its exact parents remain unknown.

Populus × tomentosa has relatively more fibrous roots than other trees.

Distribution 
Populus × tomentosa is found across northern and eastern China, and has been introduced to the US state of Louisiana.

References 

tomentosa
Endemic flora of China
Flora of Inner Mongolia
Flora of Manchuria
Flora of North-Central China
Flora of South-Central China
Flora of Southeast China